The men's decathlon competition at the 2007 Summer Universiade took place on 12 August and 13 August 2007 in the Main Stadium at the Thammasat University in Bangkok, Thailand.

Medalists

Records

Results

100 metres
Wind:Heat 1: -0.6 m/s, Heat 2: -0.9 m/s, Heat 3: -1.2 m/s

Long jump

Shot put

High jump

400 metres

110 metres hurdles
Wind:Heat 1: -0.1 m/s, Heat 2: -0.2 m/s, Heat 3: -0.3 m/s

Discus throw

Pole vault

Javelin throw

1500 metres

Final standings

See also
Athletics at the 2007 Pan American Games – Men's decathlon
2007 World Championships in Athletics – Men's decathlon
2007 Hypo-Meeting

References
 Results
 Final results
 fisu.net
 decathlon2000
 athledunet

Decathlon
2007